Strength Of Heart is the re-released version of Gary Hughes's 1989 first album Big Bad Wolf.

Track listing
All songs, music and lyrics written by Gary Hughes.
 "Some Kind Of Evil" – 4:49
 "Only True Love Lasts Forever" – 3:43
 "Strength Of Heart" – 4:43
 "Bringin' All Of Your Love To Me" – 5:10
 "Big Bad Wolf" – 3:38
 "Helen's Eyes" – 4:55
 "Man Behind The Mask" – 3:33
 "Christine" – 4:27
 "Hammer Your Heart" – 3:04
 "Can't Get You Out Of My Head" – 4:50
 "Photograph" – 5:31
 "Stay" – 4:23
 "Vigilante" – 4:58
 "Helen's Eyes (Reprise)" – 3:36

Personnel
Gary Hughes – vocals, Electric and Acoustic guitars, Fretless Bass. preliminary Drum Programming
Simon Humphrey – Fretted Bass, Drum and Bass Programming, Shirt
David Hewson – keyboards And Synthesisers
Ian Kirkham – Sax
Sandy McLelland – Backing Vocals
Additional keyboards - Howard Smith

Production 
Mixed and Mastered at Woodlands Studios
Produced by Simon Humphrey and David Hewson
Arrangements by Gary Hughes, Simon Humphrey and David Hewson
Mixing – Gary Hughes and Simon Humphrey (except tracks 10 & 11)
Mixing – Brad Anthony (tracks 10 & 11)
Engineering – Simon Humphrey
Additional Engineering – Patric Gordon, Mark Odonoughue, Simon Osbourne, Danny Pickard, Neil Ferguson.

1990 albums
Gary Hughes albums
Chrysalis Records albums
Albums produced by Gary Hughes